Samuel Stanfield Singer (2 May 1920 – 13 November 1989) was a Scottish episcopal clergyman who was Dean of Glasgow and Galloway from 1974 to 1987.

Career 

Singer was born on 2 May 1920. He was educated at  Trinity College, Dublin, and ordained a deacon in 1943, and as a priest in 1944. Following a curacy at Christ Church, Derriaghy, Northern Ireland, he was a Minor Canon at Down Cathedral from 1945 until 1947. 

After another curacy in Wirksworth, Singer was Vicar of Middleton, Derbyshire, then Rector of All Saints, Glasgow. He was Dean of Glasgow and Galloway from 1974 to 1987. Singer died on 13 November 1989.

References

Alumni of Trinity College Dublin
Deans of Glasgow and Galloway
1920 births
1989 deaths